Thomas Jeremy King, Baron King of Bridgwater,  (born 13 June 1933) is a British politician. A member of the Conservative Party, he served in the Cabinet from 1983 to 1992, and was the Member of Parliament (MP) for the constituency of Bridgwater in Somerset from 1970 to 2001. He was made a life peer in 2001.

Life and career

Education
King was educated at two independent schools: at St Michael's School, a former boys' preparatory school (later co-educational), in the village of Tawstock in North Devon, followed by Rugby School (Sheriff House), a boarding school for boys in Warwickshire, before attending Emmanuel College, Cambridge.

Military service
King was commissioned as an officer in the Somerset Light Infantry in 1952 and during his period of national service he was seconded to the King's African Rifles.

Political career
King was elected to Parliament at the 1970 Bridgwater by-election, following the death of the sitting MP, Sir Gerald Wills.

King was brought into the Cabinet in 1983 by Prime Minister Margaret Thatcher. After brief stints as the Environment Secretary and Transport Secretary, he went on to hold the posts of Employment Secretary and Northern Ireland Secretary at a time when these were high-profile roles with the potential for controversy.

In October 1988, John McCann, Finbar Cullen and Martina Shanahan, all from the Republic of Ireland, were convicted at Winchester Crown Court of conspiracy to murder King near his home in Wiltshire and sentenced to 25 years in gaol. No evidence was produced in the trial that the defendants belonged to the IRA. The trio were freed after serving two and a half years after their convictions were quashed. The Court of Appeal ruled that their trial could have been prejudiced by comments made by King who said the defendants should not have the right to remain silent. The former Master of the Rolls, Lord Denning, criticised the Appeal Court ruling, stating: "British justice has been betrayed by the Court of Appeal, in my opinion. Justice was done at Winchester Crown Court."

King went on to serve as Defence Secretary under Prime Minister John Major during the Gulf War. He left the Cabinet after the 1992 general election, and returned to the backbenches where he served as Chairman of the Intelligence and Security Select Committee from 1994 to 2001, during which time KGB agent Vasili Mitrokhin defected to reveal 87-year-old Melita Norwood as a Soviet spy.

King left the House of Commons at the 2001 general election, and was created a life peer as Baron King of Bridgwater, of Bridgwater in the County of Somerset on 9 July 2001. He now sits in the House of Lords. He serves as Deputy Chairman of the Conservative Party's Policy Group on National and International Security, which was set up by David Cameron in 2006.

In popular culture
King was portrayed by Peter Blythe in the 2004 BBC production of The Alan Clark Diaries.

King was the subject of a song in the satirical ITV programme Spitting Image in which he was depicted as the Invisible Man during his term as Employment Secretary.

References

External links 
 

|-

|-

|-

|-

|-

|-

1933 births
Living people
20th-century British Army personnel
Alumni of Emmanuel College, Cambridge
British Secretaries of State for Employment
British Secretaries of State for the Environment
Conservative Party (UK) MPs for English constituencies
Conservative Party (UK) life peers
Life peers created by Elizabeth II
King's African Rifles officers
Members of the Order of the Companions of Honour
Members of the Privy Council of the United Kingdom
People educated at Rugby School
Secretaries of State for Defence (UK)
Secretaries of State for Northern Ireland
Secretaries of State for Transport (UK)
UK MPs 1966–1970
UK MPs 1970–1974
UK MPs 1974
UK MPs 1974–1979
UK MPs 1979–1983
UK MPs 1983–1987
UK MPs 1987–1992
UK MPs 1992–1997
UK MPs 1997–2001